Byron Shane Chubbuck (born February 26, 1967), also known as Robin the Hood or Oso Blanco de Aztlán is a convicted American bank robber and indigenous activist. Starting in 1998, Chubbuck would rob numerous banks until he was captured in August 1999. During his criminal run, he informed bank tellers that the money which he stole would go towards the indigenous Zapatista army in Southern Mexico. After being charged with 13 counts of bank robbery and 1 count of attempted bank robbery, he was imprisoned at Santa Fe County Jail, where he remained until his escape in December 2000. 

After his escape, Chubbuck continued to expropriate his money to Zapatistas. During this time, he was placed under the "15 most wanted" list of fugitives by the United States Marshal Service. In February 2001, he was captured again by FBI agents after a vehicle stakeout and car chase. After being caught, he was sentenced to 80 years of jail time with a release date of 2071, which he is currently serving in the United States Penitentiary, Victorville in Victorville, CA.

First capture 
On August 13, 1999, three days after his last known bank robbery, FBI agents went to his residence in Albuquerque, New Mexico, where they interviewed his wife, who revealed Chubbuck to be her husband. During this interview, Chubbuck arrived to his home, where he and the agents participated in a minor shooting with no injuries. He escaped, but he was found the next day hiding with family members at an adjacent apartment. After breaking through the walls of the apartment complex, he jumped out of a window in an escape attempt, but he was quickly captured and arrested. On October 14, he pled guilty to 14 bank heists, for which he was sentenced to 40 years of prison time.

Escape 
On December 21, 2000, Chubbuck unlocked his handcuffs and broke out of a prisoner transport van by kicking down the steel-mashed windows. He ran away from the guards, who were unable to chase after him to prevent the other prisoners in the van from escaping as well. After this, he coerced a man and woman into driving him to a nearby Wendy's restaurant. 

In a call to KZRR-FM radio station on February 5, 2001, Chubbuck admitted to "robbing banks to help the Zapatistas in Chiapas, Mexico". Chubbuck said he would turn himself in on the conditions that an FBI agent admit that he was trying to kill him and for a jail guard to be arrested for abusing inmates, claiming that "He beats inmates, he gases them, he leaves them chained". He also admitted to buying the key to free himself from his handcuffs from the guard. 

During his brief time in freedom, he robbed 8 more banks.

Second capture 
On February 6, 2001, FBI agents staked outside of a trailer van where Chubbuck was hiding using an undercover mole. After Chubbuck was confirmed to be in there, a shootout started, where Chubbuck attempted to make a car getaway. After a short chase, Chubbuck was shot in the chest and subsequently captured. After being transported to the University of New Mexico Hospital, Chubbuck recovered from all his injuries.  

Although federal prosecutors tried having him incarcerated for life under  a federal "three strikes" law, he was finally sentenced to 80 years of jail time. He has served his sentence in multiple facilities, including the Sandoval County Jail, the US Penitentiary in Leavenworth, Kansas, and the Victorville USP in Victorville, CA which is where he is currently imprisoned.

References 

1967 births
People from Albuquerque, New Mexico
Indigenous activists of the Americas
American bank robbers
Living people